This is a list of the curling clubs in the United States.

In October 2022, the membership of USA Curling ratified the board of directors' vote to remove the Grand National Curling Club (GNCC) as a regional association. Some clubs have opted to leave USA Curling while retaining membership in the GNCC. Some clubs will remain members of both USA Curling and the GNCC.

Terms

Quick links

Maps 

Volunteers/Dakota Curling: Curling clubs, along with bars and other locations to curl

USA Curling club directory

Club list

Clubs with asterisks in the "Memberships" category have not confirmed their membership for 2023.

 Roadrunner's move from USCA to GNCC is effective June 2023.

Inactive clubs

College clubs

Associations

Other facilities

Roving clubs and organizations

References and external links

Curling in the United States
United States
Curling